Daily Guide is a private-owned daily newspaper owned by the Blay Family published in Accra, Ghana. The paper was started in 1984.  This daily newspaper is published six times per week and is regarded as the most circulated independent paper in Ghana with a readership of about 50,000 copies a day. The editor of the newspaper is Samuel Amponsah Boadi, with Fortune Alimi as Executive Editor.

See also
List of newspapers in Ghana
Media of Ghana

References

External links
Official site
The Daily Guides

Newspapers published in Ghana
Mass media in Accra